Xunzi may refer to:
 Xunzi (book) (荀子), an ancient Chinese collection of philosophical writings attributed to the below figure
 Xun Kuang (荀況), a 3rd-century BC philosopher and teacher, known as "Master Xun" ("Xunzi"), to whom the Xunzi is traditionally attributed